Banagher (pronounced) is a parish in County Londonderry, Northern Ireland. The parish is made up of the medieval parish of Banagher and parts of the ancient parish of Boveva and the townland of Tireighter and Park, once in the parish of Cumber. Banagher has many ancient monuments, including churches, holy wells, standing stones and chambered graves.

Geography
Banagher lies in the western foothills of the Sperrin Mountains, between the rivers Roe and Faughan. The landscape is mostly rugged, with glens and narrow valleys rising into the highlands. Banagher Glen is a good example of the area's terrain and forms an important conservation area, preserving one of the few surviving examples of old-growth deciduous woodland in Ireland. The Glen has a trail which climbs through the woods to Altnaheglish Dam and Reservoir, which supplies water to Derry. The path up to the dam from the valley floor climbs through deciduous woodland and higher coniferous woodland to moor and heathland.  Banagher Glen is one of the few places in the U.K. or Ireland that still boasts ancient woodland largely untouched by humans.  Its magnificent old oaks tower over the local rivers offering a mysterious and beautiful glimpse into the past.  Rare red squirrels can be spotted foraging for acorns.

Climate

History
It is clear from the Annals of Ulster that there was a church at Banagher in 1121. In that year it is recorded that Giolla Easpaig Eoghain O hAindiaraidh, king of Keenaght, was killed by kinsmen in the Banagher cemetery. His name means 'servant of Bishop Eoghan', apparently a reference to St Eugene, Bishop of Ardstraw.

On a sandy ridge by the River Owenreagh are the ruins of the old church and of a small square building sometimes called 'the abbey', with sharply pointed gables which once supported a stone roof. The church had a nave and chancel, but little remains of it. In the nearby cemetery is an ancient cross and a monument to St Muriedhach O'Heney, who is said to have founded the church and to have been abbot of the building next to it, and on one side of this is an effigy of him. However, St Muriedhach O'Heney appears in no calendar of saints. According to local legend, St Muriedhach was led to the site of his church by a stag which carried his book on its antlers, acting as a movable lectern.

Beside the remains of the ancient church is the hole from which sand called 'Banagher sand' is drawn, long believed to give good luck to race horses when thrown over them.

There were also ruins of ancient churches at Straid and Templemoile, and the parish had a vitrified fort, on which by tradition fires were lit at Midsummer. Near the parish church is a large man-made cave.

At the time of the Plantation of Ulster in the seventeenth century, some townships of Banagher, including Ballyhanedin, were granted by the Crown to the Worshipful Company of Fishmongers of the City of London, and others to the Worshipful Company of Skinners. Banagher became a distinct Presbyterian congregation about 1753, and its first minister was John Law who was ordained in 1756.

The 18th century Church of Ireland church at Banagher, with a tower and octagonal spire, is on a rise in the ground and was built in 1782. The spire was paid for by Frederick Hervey, 4th Earl of Bristol, then Bishop of Derry, who was responsible for the construction of the famous Mussenden Temple. A Presbyterian meeting house at Ballyhanedin, in the Classical Greek style, was built by the Fishmongers' Company.

As early as 1837 there were parish schools for boys and girls at Ballagh, at Tyrglassen (supported by the Fishmongers Company) and at Fincarn.

Church of Ireland records exist for the parish of Banagher from 1821 for baptisms, 1827 for marriages, and 1837 for burials.

Griffith's valuation of Ireland, completed in 1864, shows tenements in Aughlish, Ballyhanedin, Carnanbane, Coolnamonan, Derrychrier, Drumcovit, Feeny, Fincarn, Finglen, Gallany, Killunaght, Knockan, Magheramore, Rallagh, Tamnyagan, Teeavan, Templemoyle, Tirglassan, and Umrycam.

Ten other townlands or streets of Banagher are listed at ireland.com: Ballydonegan, Dreen, Eden, Glenedra, Kilcreen, Loughtilube, Moneyhoghan, Straid, Tamnagh and Terrydreen.

Industry
The main industries are drylining, agriculture and sand quarrying, and local pastimes include fishing and hill walking.

In the 19th century, there was a large bleach-green at Knockan, where eight thousand pieces of linen were bleached and finished every year for the English markets. Some linen cloth was also woven by local farmers in their own houses.

Places of worship
There are Roman Catholic, Church of Ireland and Presbyterian churches in the parish. The Presbyterian Church at Banagher supports the work of the Church at home and overseas and also has a Boys' Brigade. There are Catholic churches at Fincairn, Altinure, and Ballymonie, where Mass is celebrated every morning on week days and in the evenings on Sundays.

Sport 
The Banagher GAC (in full, the St Mary's Banagher GAC, and in Irish CLG Naomh Mhuire Beannchar) is a Gaelic Athletic Association club. Notable members include Seán Marty Lockhart, an All Star Derry footballer.

Census 2001

Banagher is classified by the NI Statistics and Research Agency (NISRA) as being within Derry Urban Area (DUA). On Census day (29 April 2001) there were 2932 people living in Banagher. Of these:

27.3% were aged under 16 years and 15.9% were aged 60 and over
51.7% of the population were male and 48.3% were female
3.5% were from a Protestant background and 94.8% were from a Catholic background
4.4% of people aged 16-74 were unemployed.

For more details see: NI Neighbourhood Information Service

Index of Deprivation
According to the Northern Ireland Multiple Deprivation Measure (NIMDM) of 2005, of 582 wards in Northern Ireland, Banagher was ranked as the 205th most deprived. For more details see: NI Neighbourhood Information Service.

See also
List of villages in Northern Ireland
List of civil parishes of County Londonderry

References

External links
Banagher Parish at banagherparish.com
Banagher, Derry at ireland.com

Townlands of County Londonderry
Civil parishes of County Londonderry